Samarovka (Hamar) is a rural locality (a village) in Partizansky Selsoviet, Meleuzovsky District, Bashkortostan, Russia. The population was 52 as of 2010. There is 1 street.

Geography 
Samarovka is located 14 km north of Meleuz (the district's administrative centre) by road. Daryino is the nearest rural locality.

References 

Rural localities in Meleuzovsky District